
Gmina Teresin is a rural gmina (administrative district) in Sochaczew County, Masovian Voivodeship, in east-central Poland. Its seat is the village of Teresin, which lies approximately 13 kilometres (8 mi) south-east of Sochaczew and 41 km (25 mi) west of Warsaw.

Villages
Gmina Teresin contains the villages and settlements of Budki Piaseckie, Dębówka, Elżbietów, Gaj, Granice, Izbiska, Kawęczyn, Lisice, Ludwików, Maszna, Maurycew, Mikołajew, Nowa Piasecznica, Nowe Gnatowice, Nowe Paski, Paprotnia, Pawłówek, Pawłowice, Seroki-Parcela, Seroki-Wieś, Skotniki, Skrzelew, Stare Paski, Strugi, Szymanów, Teresin, Teresin-Gaj, Topołowa and Witoldów.

Neighbouring gminas
Gmina Teresin is bordered by the gminas of Baranów, Błonie, Kampinos, Leszno, Nowa Sucha, Sochaczew and Wiskitki.

References
Polish official population figures 2006

Teresin
Sochaczew County